Limulunga District is a district of Zambia, located in Western Province. The seat of the district is Limulunga.

References

Districts of Western Province, Zambia